WITS is a commercial radio station in Sebring, Florida, United States, broadcasting to the Sebring area on 1340 AM.  WITS is one of the more popular stations in the Sebring market, consistently placing among the top four stations in the market.

On January 1, 2022, WITS flipped to classic hits and adopting the "Highlands 104.3", utilizing the FM translator in its branding.

Translators
In addition to the main station, WITS is relayed by an FM translator.

Previous logo

References

External links

ITS
Radio stations established in 1959
1959 establishments in Florida